Pollehi (also Romanized as Polleh’ī; also known as Poldehī and Poleh) is a village in Mosaferabad Rural District, Rudkhaneh District, Rudan County, Hormozgan Province, Iran. At the 2006 census, its population was 32, in 7 families.

References 

Populated places in Rudan County